Pravda Vostoka (lit. The Truth of the East) is a Russian language newspaper published in Uzbekistan.

History and profile
The paper was founded in 1917 under the name Nasha gazeta (Наша газета, Our newspaper). It was given its current name in 1924, and was the main Russian language newspaper of the Uzbek SSR. It had a print run of 250,000 newspapers (1975).

Abbashon Usmanov was appointed editor-in-chief of the daily in July 2006.

References

External links
Official site

Newspapers published in the Soviet Union
Russian-language newspapers published in Uzbekistan
Publications established in 1917
1917 establishments in Asia